Thomas Meißner (born 26 March 1991) is a German professional footballer who plays as a centre-back for Hansa Rostock.

Career
Meißner joined MSV Duisburg for the 2014–15 season. On 14 July 2016, he moved to ADO Den Haag.

References

External links
 
 

1991 births
Living people
People from Schweinfurt
Sportspeople from Lower Franconia
German footballers
Footballers from Bavaria
Association football central defenders
1. FSV Mainz 05 II players
Borussia Dortmund II players
MSV Duisburg players
ADO Den Haag players
Willem II (football club) players
Puskás Akadémia FC players
FC Hansa Rostock players
3. Liga players
2. Bundesliga players
Eredivisie players
Nemzeti Bajnokság I players
German expatriate footballers
German expatriate sportspeople in the Netherlands
Expatriate footballers in the Netherlands
German expatriate sportspeople in Hungary
Expatriate footballers in Hungary